Skindergade 38/Dyrkøb 5 is a four-winged complex of 19th-century buildings with a nine-bays-long facade on Skindergade (No. 38) and a 10-bays-long facade on Dyrkøb,  opposite the Church of Our Lady, in the Old Town of Copenhagen, Denmark. The two buildings fronting the streets were listed in the Danish registry of protected buildings and places in 1951. The two side wingswhich attach them to each other along each their side of a central courtyardare not part of the heritage listing. From October 1852 until his death three years later, Søren Kierkegaard was a lodger in the apartment on the first floor (towards Skindergade). Other notable former residents include the politicians Janus Lauritz Andreas Kolderup-Rosenvinge, Orla Lehmann and Valdemar Rudolph von Raasløff.

History

Early history

The site was in the late 17th century made up of four properties. The westernmost property in Skindergade (then Klædeboderne) was listed as No. 6 in Klædebo Quarter in Copenhagen's first cadastre of 1689. It was at that time owned by hatter (hatstafferer) Poul Svendsen. The next property was as No. 8 owned by councilman Johan Drøg. The fourth property, which was situated in Dyrkøb, opposite No. 6, was as No. 246 occupied by bell-ringer at the Church of Our Lady Laurids Tot.

No. 7 and No. 8 were later merged into a single property. This large property was listed as No. 6 in the new cadastre of 1756 and was at that time owned by customs inspector Verner Schrøder (1720-1758). The old No. 6 was as No. 5 owned by tailor  Frederik Güntzmand. The old No. 246 was as No. 253 owned by  Lyder Stiefgen. No. 6 and No. 253 were later merged into a single property.

In 1801, No. 6 was owned by royal physician Hans Wilhelm Guldbrandt. The property was listed as No. 6 in the new cadastre of 1806. It was at that time owned by a cassier named Wismer. The other property was as No. 5 owned by Bruus Peters. The two properties were both destroyed during the British bombardment of the city in 1807. The British troops aimed for the tower of the Church of Our Lady (the highest in the city) and the area close to the church was therefore particularly hard hit by the bombardment.

J. S. Starrinsky and the new building

The two properties were acquired by court master chimney sweeper Johan Samuel Starrinsky  (1734-1826) and merged into a single property in 1811. The building fronting Dyrkøb was constructed for him in 1812–13. The building fronting Skindergade was constructed for him with two storeys over a walk-out basement in 1822. This was not his first construction project since the property at Læderstræde 27 had also been constructed for him back in 1800.

Starinsky was married to Johanne Eleonora Nitsche (1641-1828). They had three children. The daughter  Johanne Wilhelmine Eleonora Starinsky (1771-1841) was married to vicar Peder Sølling (1766-1839). The younger daughter Anne Eleonora Starinsky (1777-1795) died just 18 years old in 1795. The son Samuel Starinsky (1791-1840) grew up to become a medical doctor. The property was after his mother's death in 1929 passed to him. Since he was stationed as a regiment physician in Næstved, he did not himself live in the building. Samuel Starinsky was married to Johanne Justine Brøndlund (1794-1845). They had three daughters: Eleonora Sophie (1826-1893), Ida Elisabeth (1727-1847) and Anna Birgitta (1834-1881).

Janus Lauritz Andreas Kolderup-Rosenvinge (1792-1885), a professor of law, was a tenant in one of the apartments from 1824 to 1830. Orla Lehmann (1810-1870), who would later play a central role in the drafting of the Danish constitution, was as a young jurist among the residents in 1836.

1840; Mrs. Starinsky, Mrs. Bories and Søren Kierkegaard
 
Samuel and Johanne Justine Starinsky resided in Købmagergade in Næstved at the time of the 1840 census. They lived there with their three daughters, a maid, a female cook, a nanny and a male servant. Their building in Copenhagen was at the same time home to a total of 49 residents. Philip Borries (1779-1840), a merchant (grosserer)), resided in one of the first floor apartments with his wife Catharine Christiane Borries (née Lütken, 1789–1867), their 12-year-old son, a seamstress and a maid. M. C. G. Echmann, a customs officer, resided in the other first floor apartment with his wife Frederike Echmann (née Baltzer), their 20-year-old daughter Lovise Marie Echmann, a male servant, a maid, a female cook and a lodger. The ground floor was also home to two households. Nicolette Bruun (née Crone, 1798–1840), widow of captain in the Royal Danish Navy Peter Urban Bruun (1785-1833), resided in one of the two ground floor apartments with three of her children (aged 16 to 26) and one maid. Dorthea Birch, widow of a chief gravedigger, resided in the other ground floor apartment with two unmarried sons (aged 28 and 44), a maid and the lodgers Ove and Christian Lum.  Christian Døhne, a junk dealer, resided in the basement with his wife Ane Norin Døhne, their five children (aged one to 15) and one maid. Frederik Nielsen, another junk dealer, was also residing in the basement with his wife Ane Frederiksdatter and one maid.

 
Johannes Andreas Wiberg, a cantor and teacher associated the Church of Our Lady and Holmen Church, resided on the ground floor of the building on Dyrkøb with his six children (aged 12 to 27) and one maid. Frederikke Christine Lange, widow of Rasmus Hansen Lange, resided on the first floor with the relative Anne Margrethe Lange, one lodger, one maid and one female cook. Mariane Elisabeth Gjermand, widow of a textile manufacturer, resided on the second floor with one maid.

Johannes Justine Starinsky and Borries were both widowed later the same year. Johanne Justine Starinsky kept the property in Copenhagen after her husband's death. Her husband's death left Mrs. Borries in difficult circumstances but a contract with the husband's brother and former business partner secured her an annual allowance from the first and she was therefore able to keep the large apartment.

Valdemar Rudolph von Raasløff (1815-1883), a later diplomat and government minister, was among the residents of the building in 1842.

The building was heightened from two to three storeys in the late 1840s. The property was home to a total of 43 residents at the time of the 1850 census. Johanne Justine Stavinsky resided in the second floor apartment with her daughter Anna Bergette Nicoline Stavinsky, one maid and the jurists Paul Emil Rosenörn and Axel Rosenörn. Catharine Christiane Borries resided in the first floor apartment with her sons Ernst Gustav Ludvig Borries and Carl August Borries, one maid and three lodgers. One of the lodgers was the Rigsdag member Christian Marius Poulsen. Andreas Christian Möller, a wine merchant, resided on the ground floor to the right with his Thora Othilia Møller, their two children (aged one and 12) and two maids. Maria Amalie Broager, a widow, resided on the ground floor to the left with her son  Frederik Christian Broager and one maid. 
Hans Sivertsen Hou, a junk dealer, resided on the ground floor with his wife Kirstine Hou, two of their children (aged 19 and 37) and one maid. Hans Frederik Paulsen, a kandidat, resided on the first floor with his wife Anna Magrete Paulsenm their fice children (aged two to 12) and one maid. Marcus Melchior, a clerk, resided on the second floor with his wife Sara Melchior, their two children (aged one and two), rqi nauds and the 63-year-old widow Betty Lazarus. Three students resided on the first floor of one of the side wings.

In October 1852, Søren Kierkegaard rented a room from Mrs. Borries on the first floor. Borries had initially been reluctant to rent him the rooms, having heard that he was a trouble-maker. Kiergegaard was an old classmate of her son Ernst from the Borgerdyd School In December, Kierkegaard published a fierce attack on the newly deceased Bishop Jacob Peter Mynster in Fædrelandet, something that terrified his hostress. It was later continued in a series of pamphlets entitled Øjeblikkense. Kiergegaard was physically exhausted by the conflict. In October 1855 he collapsed on the street. He died in Frederiks Hospital after over a month.

A few years later, after some 20 years in the building, Johannes Justine Starinsky and Christiane Borries both moved out of the building in Skindergade. Borries' next home was at Frederiksberg Allé 36. Starinsky was by 1770 residing in an apartment on the second floor at Svanholmsvej 4,. She lived there with her three children and one maid.

1860 census

At the time of the 1860 census, No. 5/6 was home to 42 residents. Peder Nielsen, a grocer (høker), resided in the basement to the right with his wife Marie and their four children (aged two to eight). Jens Peter Jensen, another grocer )høker), resided in the basement to the left with his wife Sophie Wilhelmine Marie f. Petersen and their one-year-old daughter. Lauritz Christian Nielsen, a textile merchant, resided on the ground flor to the right with his wife Rosa Nielsen, their two children (aged one and three) and two maids. Peter and Julie Jensen, a young married couple, resided on the ground floor to the left. Daniel Kiellerup, a businessman (mægler), resided on the first floor with his wife Wilhelmine Cecilie Kiellerup, their 29-year-old daughter Adelaide Wilhelmine Kiellerup, their 12-year-old granddaughter Anna Kiellerup, rwo of the wife's sisters, a female cook and two maids. Levin Salomonsen, a businessman (grosserer), resided on the second floor with his wife Lea Salomonsen, two daughters (aged 18 and 22) and one maid. Adolph Isak Ehrenholtz, a businessman (kommissionær), resided on the ground floor towards Dyrkøb with his Marie Ehrenholz and their 12-year-old daughter. Rosalie Agate Holm, a widow, resided on the first floor with her two children (aged 19 and 21) and one maid. Wilhelmine Schumacher, widow of a kammerråd, resided on the second floor with her son Fritz Schumacher and one maid. Christiane Hedevig Hoff, a 65-year-old unmarried woman, resided in the garret.

H. Striers Chemical Laboratory

The building was later acquired by H. Struer's Chemical Laboratory. The company was founded on 15 November 1875 by Holger Struer (1846-1931). In 1903, he took I. Windfeld-Hansen oandR. Eltang som medindehavere as partners. He retired from the company in 1916. Marius Julian Bendt Grubb (1873-1948) was at the same time made a partner. In  1931, he became its sole owner. On 1 January 1940, he took his son Kjeld Tue Grubb (1904-) as a partner. In  1943, he also made his other son Bendt Grubb (1913-) a partner.

Architecture

Skindergade is constructed with three storeys over a walk-out basement and is nine bays long. The design of the ground floor with large, arched display window's dates from around 1900. Every second window on the first floor are accented with framing and hood moulds supported by corbels. The pitched roof features four dormer windows towards the street.

 
Dyrkøb 5 is also constructed with three storeys over a walk-out basement but is ten bays long. The plastered facade is painted in a pale yellow colour. A gate with access to the courtyard is located in the bay furthest to the right. Two round windows are located next to the gate at the transition between the ground floor and first floor. The pitched red tile roof features three dormer windows towards the street.

The two buildings are attached to each other via two  side wings along each their side of a central courtyard. Skindergade 38 has seven exposed towards the courtyard as well as a canted corner bay. Dyrløb 5 had just five exposed bays towards the courtyard.

The two wings fronting the streets were listed in the Danish registry of protected buildings and places in 1951. The two side wings are not part of the heritage listing.

Today
As of 2009, Skindergade 38 was owned by Dansk Ejendomsfond I A/S. The property is managed by DEAS and has a total floor area of 2,099 square metres. Tenants include the law firm Minerva Advokater and Dansk Revision (2022).

References

External links

 Starinsky
 Source
 Source
 Source
 Source
 Læge

Listed residential buildings in Copenhagen